Kuttikkattoor and Velliparamba are two adjacent suburbs of Kozhikode city separated by three kilometres on the road to Mavoor.  These villages are also connected to Palazhi and Pantheeramkavu areas.

Etymology
Velliparamba is sometimes described by local names like Ancham Mile and Aram Mile.  Keezhmadu, Poojapura, Mampuzha,  Ummalathoor, Kovoor Town, Chemmathoor, Punathil Bazar, Mayanad, Peruvayal, Perumanna, and Poovattuparamba are the adjoining villages.

Important organizations
 MediaOne TV
 Devagiri College
 Calicut Medical College
 AWH Engineering College 
 Center for Water Resources Development and Management (CWRDM)
 AWH Polytechnic College
 Government High School Kuttikkattoor
 Bee Line Public School Kuttikkattoor
 Imbichali usthad Memorial Islamic Center(IMIC) College
 NOEL Crest villas Atarwala Road Velliparambu calicut

Suburbs and villages
 Poovattuparamba, Kizhmadu and Mattummal
 V.N.Road, Saraswsathynagar, Chelavoor and Moozhikkal
 Anchammile, Arammile and Anakuzhikara

See also
 Kovoor Town
 Devagiri
 Calicut Medical College
 Chevayur
 Palazhi
 Silver Hills

Location

References

Villages in Kozhikode district
Kozhikode east